Kömörő is a village in Szabolcs-Szatmár-Bereg County, in the Northern Great Plain region of eastern Hungary.

Etymology
The name comes from the Slavic *komarъ (a mosquito) with the suffix -ov. 1181 Kemerew.

Geography

References

Populated places in Szabolcs-Szatmár-Bereg County